Helen Lake is located in Glacier National Park, in the U.S. state of Montana. Helen Lake is at the head of the Belly River and is situated below Ahern Peak to the west and Ipasha Peak to the northwest. Numerous small streams feed the lake in addition to melt waters from the Ahern Glacier which descend  over Ahern Glacier Falls in one sheer drop to a talus slope below en route to the lake.

See also
List of lakes in Glacier County, Montana

References

Lakes of Glacier National Park (U.S.)
Lakes of Glacier County, Montana